Rudrakaal is an  Indian crime thriller television series which premiered on 7 March 2021 on Star Plus and Disney+ Hotstar.
Produced by Dashami Creations, it stars Bhanu Uday and Dipannita Sharma. It abruptly went off-air on 10 May 2021, due to the COVID-19 curfew in Maharashtra.

Summary
D.C.P. Officer, Ranjan Chittoda is on a mission to find his mentor's killer. Balancing out his personal and professional life, he is in for a shock when the killer is revealed and vows to teach him a lesson.

Cast

Main
 Bhanu Uday as D.C.P. Ranjan Chittoda: Gayatri's husband; Anshuman's father
 Dipannita Sharma as Gayatri Chittoda: Ranjan's wife; Anshuman's mother
 Rudraksha Jaiswal as Anshuman Ranjan Chittoda: Gayatri and Ranjan's son
 Rajit Kapur as Baldev Singh: Ranjan's mentor and Police Commissioner, Mumbai

Recurring
 Shruti Marathe as Smita Thakur
 Kishor Kadam as Jagadish Ahire
 Bijay Anand as Malik Raza
 Monica Chaudhry 
 Pamela Singh Bhutoria as Meera Basu 
 Suraj Singh 
 Sandeep Shridhar Dhabale 
 Swanand Kirkire as Phoolchand Mishra
 Flora Saini as Chitra Agnihotri
 Kanupriya Shankar Pandit: Baldev's wife

Production

Development
The production of series began in November 2020 and the series was planned to launch in December 2020. However, its launch was delayed and it was launched in March 2021. Before its television premiere, the first episode was released a week before in Hotstar on 28 February 2021. On 13 April 2021, when the chief minister of Maharashtra announced a curfew from 15 April, the shoot of Rudrakaal halted until the government's next hearing. Soon, the show's cancellation was confirmed.

Casting
Talking about the preparations for his role, lead actor Bhanu Uday stated, "The character of DCP Ranjan Chittoda required a lot of attention to detail. It required me to visit my local police station and understand the various characteristics of a police officer. They were kind enough to guide and help me understand the minuscule details like body language, police protocol and the most important aspect the mind-set of a cop". Further he stated, "I gained 10 kg of weight for this role in a span of 15 days and underwent extreme preparation for the same". Rudhraksh Jaiswal playing Anshuman Chittoda stated, "I had to watch a couple of movies which helped me bring out the right amount of emotion. I also learnt to play the guitar by watching videos. Besides that, we (cast from the show) attended workshops."

Release
The first promo of the series was released on 19 December 2020 featuring Bhanu Uday. The series premiered on 7 March 2021 in the 7:00 pm time slot on StarPlus and offered special access to episodes, a week before airing through Hotstar VIP. It later shifted to the 6:00 pm time slot to accommodate the IPL 2021.

References

Santosh shetty directed this crime thriller , he has been done fabulous work in Cid before , Co directed by Pride Subramnain and Anshul kumar sharma is  associate director ,Ramesha k barti] was First Assistant Director in this thriller series. Ramesha k barti was also associated with Bullets series and directed movie Goswami Lakshminath Pramahans

External links 
 

Indian crime television series
Indian thriller television series
Indian action television series
StarPlus original programming
Hindi-language television shows
2021 Indian television series debuts
Television shows set in Mumbai